Veendum Chila Veettukaryangal is a 1999 Indian Malayalam-language family drama film directed by Sathyan Anthikkad and written by A. K. Lohithadas. The film was produced by P. V. Gangadharan and was distributed by Kalpaka Films. Starring Jayaram, Thilakan, and Samyuktha Varma. It was the debut film of Samyuktha Varma. Lohithadas makes a cameo appearance. Samyuktha Varma won the Kerala State Film Award for Best Actress.

Plot
Thirumuttathu Kochuthoma (Thilakan) is a member of an acting troupe. He has a wife named Mary (K.P.A.C. Lalitha), three sons named Johny Kutty, Paul, and Roy (E.A Rajendran, Siddique and Jayaram), and two daughters. His youngest son Roy, is also a stage actor in the same troupe and an aspiring writer.

Kochuthoma and Mary have seen hard times and have managed to raise their children well. However, their youngest son Roy had an easy childhood and has become spoiled. He received his diploma in automobile engineering. He is jobless, but is not trying to find a job. He is active in the church choir and a drama group. His ambition is to make it big in the film industry.

His father shares his dramatic pursuits. The two go to rehearsals together and come home late, causing Mary to worry. Paul, who is a banker, is a critic of the duo and their pursuit of stardom.

Bhavana (Samyuktha Varma) is a young girl from a poor family. She works to support her mentally unstable mother. She goes door-to-door selling various products. Roy, who was looking for a heroine for a production, bumps into Bhavana, who is willing to take the role because she needs money. Slowly he falls in love with her. He later marries her against his father's wish and Thoma asks them to move out.

Roy and Bhavana start their married life in Bhavana's small home. Roy soon begins to feel the difficulties of life. He is too lazy to work and Bhavana starts earning for the family. They get no help from Thoma.

Roy meets movie directors and writers. One of these directors (A. K. Lohithadas) has a car breakdown. Roy helps to repair the car. The director advises him to go into vehicle repair, leading Roy to start a successful career in that field.

Meanwhile, his family goes through tough times. Paul suffers losses and his bank is closed down. Thoma loses the money he had deposited in the bank for the marriage of Lisy, his youngest daughter. He also becomes hospitalized. With Roy's help, Lisy's marriage is conducted and Roy and Bhavana make a triumphant entry back to their home. Roy realizes that this was all planned by his father to make him understand the value of supporting himself, independence and the danger of laziness.

Cast

 Jayaram as Roy Thomas
 Thilakan as Kochuthoma
 Samyuktha Varma as Bhavana
 K.P.A.C. Lalitha as Maryppennu
 Siddique as Paul Thomas
 A. K. Lohithadas as Lohit Kumar
 Oduvil Unnikrishnan as Fr. Nedumaram
 Mamukkoya as Kunjoonju
 Kuthiravattam Pappu as Kunjiraman Aashaan
 Nedumudi Venu as Aravindan
 Santhakumari as Bhavana's Mother
 Sona Nair as Sheela Paul
 Reena as Beena Thomas
 Vishnuprakash as Dr. Jose
 Master Sanjeev as Vinu
 E. A. Rajendran as Johnnykutty
 Srihari as Adv. Chandran Nair
 Thesni Khan as Leelamma
 Sreejaya as Lisy Thomas
 Ottapalam Leelamma as Theater Artist
Jijoy Rajagopal as Theater Artist
 Meenakshi Sunil as Sofia
 Krishnakumar as Businessman Anil Kurup

Crew

Songs

Awards
Kerala State Film Awards
 Best Film with Popular Appeal and Aesthetic Value
 Best Actress - Samyuktha Varma

Asianet Film Awards'
 Best Film
 Best Script Writer - A. K. Lohithadas
 Best Cinematographer - Vipin Mohan

Filmfare Awards South
 Filmfare Award for Best Film – Malayalam - P. V. Gangadharan

Other Awards
 Film Critics Award for Best Script - A. K. Lohithadas

References

External links
 
 http://www.mouthshut.com/review/Veendum_Chila_Veettukaryangal-80680-1.html

1990s Malayalam-language films
1990s romantic comedy-drama films
Films scored by Johnson
Indian romantic comedy-drama films
1998 films
Films directed by Sathyan Anthikad
Films with screenplays by A. K. Lohithadas
Films shot in Palakkad
Films shot in Ottapalam
1998 comedy films
1999 comedy films
1998 drama films
1999 drama films
1999 films